Zeenat Barkatullah is a retired Bangladeshi dancer and television actress. She received Bachsas Awards, Bangladesh Cultural Society Lifetime Achievement Award and Natyashabha Award for her contributions to the field of dance.

Early life and education
Barkatullah was a student of Gazi Alimuddin Mannan at the age of 4. She earned her masters in sociology from the University of Dhaka and joined the Performing Arts Academy. She completed a six-year certificate course from Bulbul Lalitakala Academy and later in ballet and dance choreography under experts from North Korea. Her father was the Deputy Magistrate of Jamalpur District.

Career
Barkatullah worked as one of the directors of Bangladesh Shilpakala Academy since 2002. She acted in around 80 television drama plays. Her acting career began with the drama Maria Amar Maria in 1980. She later acted in Ghore Baire, Osthai Nibas, Boro Bari, and Kotha Bola Moyna, among others.

Barkatullah is one of the advisors of Bangladesh Nrityo Shilpi Songstha, Nrityanchal and Bangabandhu Shishu Kishor Mela.

On 22 January 2022, Barkatullah was awarded the Ekushey Padak, the second most important award for civilians in Bangladesh.

Personal life
Barkatullah has two daughters including actress Bijori Barkatullah and Kajori Barkatullah.

Awards
 Sher-e-Bangla Memorial Award (1985)
 Natya Shabha Award (1987)
 Cadet Core Award (1989)
 UNESCO Award (1996)
 Tarokalok Award (1997)
 Millennium Award (2000) 
 Amritabazar Award (2001)
 Bangladesh Shilpakala Academy Award (2008)

References

Living people
University of Dhaka alumni
Bangladeshi female dancers
Bangladeshi television actresses
Year of birth missing (living people)
Place of birth missing (living people)
Recipients of the Ekushey Padak